Antsalova is a town and commune in western Madagascar. It belongs to the district of Antsalova, which is a part of Melaky Region. The population of the commune was estimated to be approximately 58,280 in 2018.

Antsalova is served by a local Antsalova Airport. Primary and junior level secondary education are available in town. The town provides access to hospital services to its citizens.

Farming and raising livestock provides employment for 20% and 76% of the working population.  The most important crop is rice, while other important products are maize and cassava.  Services provide employment for 1% of the population. Additionally fishing employs 3% of the population.

Roads
The Nationale Road 8a leads northwards to  Maintirano.

See also 
The Maningoza Reserve is located near Antsalova.

References and notes 

Populated places in Melaky